Jonas Kaupys  (1941–2000) was a Lithuanian art restorer.

See also
List of Lithuanian painters

References
Universal Lithuanian Encyclopedia

1941 births
2000 deaths
Artists from Vilnius
20th-century Lithuanian painters